Knut Anders Sørum (born 12 April 1976) is a Norwegian singer from Østre Toten. He represented Norway at Eurovision Song Contest 2004 in Istanbul with the pop-ballad "High". He was also a vocalist and keyboard player for the Norway-based Christian extreme metal band Vardøger for many years (1994-2006, 2007, 2008–2018).

Eurovision 2004
He won the Norwegian Melodi Grand Prix, the selection process for Eurovision Song Contest in the 2004 contest, gaining the right to represent Norway at Eurovision 2004 in Istanbul with the pop-ballad "High", written by two Swedish composers. In the final, he came last, with just three points, all coming from Sweden.

Career
After Eurovision, Knut Anders Sørum did backing vocals for the Wig Wam 2006 album Wig Wamania.

After a hiatus spending many years, he released his first studio album in 2010 called Prøysen reaching number 12 in the VG-lista, the official Norwegian Albums Chart followed by a second album Ting Flyt that entered at number 7 in its first week of release in May 2013.

Personal life
He is a great supporter of the Salvation Army. He came out as bisexual admitting his attraction to both males and females in an interview with the Norwegian gay magazine Gaysir.

Discography

Albums

Other albums
2016: Ting flyt remix 
2016: Audiens 1:1 
2017: Knut Anders Sørum Live 
2019: Dom vonde orda

Singles

Discography with Vardøger

Albums
2015: Ghost Notes

EPs
2003: Whitefrozen

References

External links
Official website

1976 births
Living people
People from Østre Toten
21st-century Norwegian male singers
Eurovision Song Contest entrants for Norway
Melodi Grand Prix contestants
Eurovision Song Contest entrants of 2004
Melodi Grand Prix winners
English-language singers from Norway
Bisexual men
Bisexual singers
Norwegian LGBT singers
Norwegian bisexual people